The Linganamakki Dam (Kannada : ಲಿಂಗನಮಕ್ಕಿ ಜಲಾಶಯ) was constructed by the Karnataka State Government in 1964. Located in the Kargal village of Sagara taluk, the dam has a length of  stretching across the Sharavathi river. It is located about 9 km from Jog Falls.
It has a storage capacity of 4.29 cubic kms or 151.52 tmc ft of water.

References

Hydroelectric power stations in Karnataka
Dams in Karnataka
Buildings and structures in Shimoga district
Dams completed in 1964
1964 establishments in Mysore State
20th-century architecture in India